Shaarai Torah Synagogue (Hebrew: שַׁעֲרֵי תּוֹרָה, "Gates of Learning") is an historic former synagogue building at 32 Providence Street in Worcester, Massachusetts. Worcester's first Modern Orthodox "shul" (and 6th overall), Shaarai Torah was considered the city's "Mother Synagogue" for many years.

Origins
The congregation, which was incorporated on January 1, 1904, held daily worship services for two years in a cottage they had purchased at 32 Providence Street in the heart of Worcester's east side Union Hill neighborhood, where most Jewish immigrants to Worcester lived. High Holiday services in 1904 and 1905 were held at A.O.H. (Ancient Order of Hibernians) Hall at 26 Trumbull Street while the present structure was being built. At a final cost of $30,000 ($ in current dollar terms), the new building, designed by Edwin T. Chapin in a Classical Revival style, and modeled after Congregation Kehilath Jeshurun in New York City, opened on September 14, 1906.

Rabbinical leadership

Merger
Most of the charter members of Shaarai Torah had left Congregation Sons of Abraham, Worcester's second-oldest synagogue, because they felt it did not meet the needs of the younger generation. One of the major issues was the use of English in the synagogue. As early as 1907, Sons of Abraham leaders discussed implementing changes to make merging with Shaarai Torah possible. The merger finally took place in 1948. From then on, the synagogue was officially known as Congregation Shaarai Torah Sons of Abraham.

West Side branch
By 1957, roughly 74% of Worcester's 9,333 Jews lived on the tonier west side of the city, leaving less than 1,600 living on the east side. Additionally, most west side Jews, who were generally younger and more assimilated than those who remained on the east side, attended Reform Temple Emanuel or Conservative Congregation Beth Israel as Orthodoxy fell out of favor with most upwardly mobile American Jews. On September 10, 1959, Shaarai Torah purchased the former home of Beth Israel at 835 Pleasant Street as a west side branch, naming it Shaarai Torah West. The original building became known as Shaarai Torah East. Shaarai Torah West, affiliated with the Orthodox Union, became an independent congregation on November 9, 1964 and continues to operate to this day.

Final days
The Providence Street building was added to the National Register of Historic Places in 1990. The synagogue stopped functioning in 1996 and finally closed shortly after a devastating arson fire in 1999. Once one of at least 12 neighborhood Orthodox synagogues, when it closed Shaarai Torah was the last remaining functioning synagogue on the east side of Worcester. The building had been sold in 1997 to Al Tapper, a Worcester native and philanthropist who had plans to turn it into a Jewish museum or multi-ethnic community center, but those plans were scrapped after the fire. Tapper was able to get the developer to agree to keep the Hebrew inscriptions on the facade of the building intact.

Redevelopment
Abandoned and in disrepair, the synagogue was added to the Worcester Preservation Society's list of endangered properties. In 2003, the building was finally sold to developer Selim LaHoud who hired Kopec Contracting to convert it into 13 apartments known as Red Oak Condominiums.

Notable alumni and members
S. N. Behrman, playwright and screenwriter
Charles Tobias, lyricist and inductee of the Songwriters Hall of Fame
Harry Tobias, songwriter and inductee of the Songwriters Hall of Fame

East Side Synagogue history

See also
Temple Emanuel Sinai (Worcester, Massachusetts)
Congregation Beth Israel (Worcester, Massachusetts)
National Register of Historic Places listings in eastern Worcester, Massachusetts

References

External links
 Shaarai Torah West
 The Last Minyan
 Kopec Contracting - Red Oak Condominiums

Synagogues in Worcester, Massachusetts
Synagogues on the National Register of Historic Places in Massachusetts
Neoclassical architecture in Massachusetts
Orthodox synagogues in Massachusetts
Neoclassical synagogues
Modern Orthodox synagogues in the United States
Former synagogues in Massachusetts
National Register of Historic Places in Worcester, Massachusetts
Synagogues completed in 1906
1906 establishments in Massachusetts